Birgenair Flight 301 was a flight chartered by Turkish-managed Birgenair partner Alas Nacionales from Puerto Plata in the Dominican Republic to Frankfurt, Germany, via Gander, Canada, and Berlin, Germany. On February 6, 1996, the 757-200 operating the route crashed shortly after take-off from Puerto Plata's Gregorio Luperón International Airport. All 189 people on board died. The cause was pilot error after receiving incorrect airspeed information from one of the pitot tubes, which investigators believe was blocked by a wasp nest built inside it. The aircraft had been sitting unused for 20 days, and without pitot tube covers in place for the preceding 2 days before the crash.

Flight 301 shares the title of deadliest aviation crash involving a Boeing 757 alongside American Airlines Flight 77, both having 189 total fatalities. Furthermore, Flight 301 is the deadliest aviation accident ever to have occurred in the Dominican Republic.

Aircraft and crew
The aircraft was a 11-year-old Boeing 757-225 originally delivered to Eastern Air Lines in February 1985 and registered as N516EA. It was powered by two Rolls-Royce RB211-535E4 engines. After Eastern Air Lines's bankruptcy and subsequent liquidation in 1991, the aircraft was stored at the Mojave Air and Space Port for more than a year. It was purchased by Aeronautics Leasing in April 1992, and then leased to Canadian airline Nationair in May 1992, and stayed with the airline until its demise the following year. It was leased again by the same lessor in July 1993 to Birgenair and then sub-leased to International Caribbean Airways in December 1994, and Birgenair operated the airliner until it crashed.

The crew consisted of 11 Turks and 2 Dominicans. The captain was Ahmet Erdem (61),  with 24,750 flight hours of experience (including 1,875 hours on the Boeing 757). The first officer was Aykut Gergin (34). He had 3,500 hours of flying experience, though only 71 hours were on the Boeing 757. The relief pilot was Muhlis Evrenesoğlu (51). He had 15,000 flight hours of experience (with 121 of them on the Boeing 757).

Passengers
The passengers consisted mainly of Germans, along with nine Poles including two Members of the Parliament, Zbigniew Gorzelańczyk of the Democratic Left Alliance, and Marek Wielgus of the Nonpartisan Bloc for Support of Reforms (BBWR). Most of the passengers had booked Caribbean package holidays with Öger Tours; Birgenair held 10% of Öger Tours.

Accident

During takeoff roll at 23:42 AST (03:42 UTC), the captain found that his airspeed indicator (ASI) was malfunctioning but he chose not to abort the takeoff. The first officer's ASI was functional, though subsequent warning indicators would cause the aircrew to question its veracity as well. The aircraft took off normally at 23:42 AST, for the first leg of the flight. At , the flight switched to main air traffic control and was instructed to climb to flight level 280. The autopilot was engaged 1 minute and 30 seconds into the flight. 

Approximately 10 seconds later, two warnings: rudder ratio and Mach airspeed trim appeared.

Then, the captain assumed that both ASI are wrong, and decided to check circuit breakers. When the first circuit breaker was checked, the overspeed warning appeared, as the captain’s ASI, the primary source of the information about airspeed for autopilot, was showing airspeed near  and increasing. Then, the second circuit breaker was pulled to silence the warning. As the plane was climbing through , the captain's ASI read . The autopilot, which was taking its airspeed information from the same equipment that was providing faulty readings to the captain's ASI, increased the pitch-up attitude and reduced power in order to lower the plane's airspeed. With all contradictory warnings given by the plane, the confused captain decided to reduce thrust of the plane, believing it was flying too fast. 

This action immediately triggered the 757's stick-shaker stall alert, warning the confused pilots that the aircraft was flying dangerously slow. Also, the autopilot disengaged. As the plane was closing to stall, its path became unstable and it started descending. Meanwhile, the controller, still unaware of any problems, called the flight, but, as the crew struggled with problems, the first officer said "Standby". First officer and relief pilot, aware of the scale of the problem, were suggesting various methods to recover from the stall, but the confused captain ignored all of them. About 20 seconds before crash, the captain finally attempted to recover from the stall by increasing the plane's thrust to full, but as the aircraft was still in a nose up attitude, the engines were prevented from receiving adequate airflow required to match the increase in thrust. The left engine flamed out, causing the right engine, which was still at full power, to throw the aircraft into a spin. Moments later, the plane inverted. At 23:47 AST, the Ground Proximity Warning System (GPWS) sounded an audible warning, and eight seconds later the plane crashed into the Atlantic Ocean. All 176 passengers and 13 crew members died on impact.

Investigation and final report
The Dominican Republic government's General Directorate of Civil Aviation (DGAC) investigated the accident and determined the probable cause to be:

The investigation concluded that one of the three pitot tubes, used to measure airspeed, was blocked.

None of the pitot tubes were recovered so investigators were unable to determine for certain what caused the blockage. Investigators believe that the most likely culprit was the black and yellow mud dauber (Sceliphron caementarium), a type of solitary sphecid wasp well known to Dominican pilots, which makes a cylindrical nest out of mud and tends to establish a nest in artificial, cylindrical structures. According to the final report, section 2.3 – "Aircraft maintenance factors", the aircraft had not flown in 20 days, however, this was not the duration for which pitots remained uncovered, but was evidently enough time to allow the wasps the opportunity to construct nests in the tubes. According to Cetin Birgen, president and CEO of Birgenair, the pitot covers were removed two days before the accident in order to conduct an engine test run.

The investigation noted a number of other factors and suggested changes. They reconfirmed that the pilots should have followed existing procedures and aborted the takeoff when they found that their airspeed indicators were already in significant disagreement as the plane accelerated down the runway. Results from a number of simulations with experienced pilots found that the combination of the overspeed warning horn and underspeed stick shaker while in flight was an overly confusing contradictory set of messages for many pilots; the FAA issued a directive that pilot training would now include a blocked pitot tube scenario. The FAA research had also revealed that the situation also led to multiple other contradictory warning sounds and warning lights that increased the demands on the pilot to fly the plane. The FAA asked Boeing to change some of those warnings, as well as add a new warning to tell both pilots that their instruments disagree, add the ability for the pilots to silence troublesome alarms, and to modify the system so that the pilots can choose which pitot tube the autopilot uses for airspeed readings.

Aftermath

Shortly after the crash of flight 301, the airline's overall image and profits became heavily damaged, and some of its planes were grounded at the same time. Birgenair went bankrupt in October of the same year as there were concerns about safety after the accident, causing a decline in passenger numbers. The crash and ensuing negative publicity both contributed to Birgenair's bankruptcy.

In popular culture
 The events of Flight 301 were featured in "Mixed Signals", a Season 5 (2007) episode of the Canadian TV series Mayday (called Air Emergency and Air Disasters in the U.S. and Air Crash Investigation in the UK and elsewhere around the world). The dramatization was broadcast with the title "The Plane That Wouldn't Talk" in the United Kingdom, Australia and Asia.
 The British television series Survival in the Sky featured the crash in its first episode, titled "Blaming the Pilot" (1996).

  (Berlin - Fateful Years of the City: Series 4, Episode 6) interviewed the Berlin parents of one of 167 German passengers who died in the flight crash.

See also

List of accidents and incidents involving commercial aircraft
Pitot-static system

Similar events
Later the same year (1996), Aeroperú Flight 603, also operated with a Boeing 757-200, suffered a similar but far more difficult situation (static ports blocked by tape, rendering all airspeed indicators and pressure altimeters unusable) and crashed in the ocean off Peru, killing all 70 people aboard.
On June 1st, 2009, Air France Flight 447 stalled and crashed over the Atlantic Ocean after pilots mishandled procedures when managing to deal with pitot tubes jammed by ice, causing them to stall the aircraft.

References

External links

 General Directorate of Civil Aviation
"FINAL AVIATION ACCIDENT REPORT BIRGENAIR FLIGHT ALW-301 PUERTO PLATA, DOMINICAN REPUBLIC FEBRUARY 6, 1996" – English translation done by the Air Line Pilots Association (ALPA).
  "REPORTE FINAL ACCIDENTE AEREO BIRGENAIR, VUELO ALW-301, FEBRERO 06,1996." (Archive).
  "Bericht der Direccion General de Aeronautica Civil der Dominikanischen Republik über die Untersuchung des Unfalles mit dem Flugzeug Boeing B-757 am 06. Februar 1996 bei Puerto Plata. [Report of the Direccion General de Aeronautica Civil of the Dominican Republic on the investigation of the accident with the Boeing B-757 aircraft on February 6, 1996 near Puerto Plata]" (Draft Final Report) – Prof. Peter B. Ladkin, PhD obtained a copy from the Deutsche Luftfahrtbundesamt – His group digitized a copy sent by Karsten Munsky, a EUCARE Member in Berlin – Document prepared for the World Wide Web by Marco Gröning and Ladkin (Alternate Archive)
  TC-GEN – Directorate General of Civil Aviation (Archive)
 CVR Transcript (Archive)
 at Airdisaster.com
 Views of the memorial and list of victims' names (Archive) 

Airliner accidents and incidents caused by instrument failure
Airliner accidents and incidents caused by pilot error
Aviation accidents and incidents in 1996
Aviation accidents and incidents in the Dominican Republic
Accidents and incidents involving the Boeing 757
Birgenair accidents and incidents
1996 in the Dominican Republic
February 1996 events in North America
Articles containing video clips
Airliner accidents and incidents caused by stalls